Twilight is an unincorporated community along Middle Wheeling Creek in Ohio County, West Virginia, United States.

A post office was located at Twilight from 1894 to 1902, when it was discontinued, and the mail redirected to Triadelphia.  A 1902 USGS topographical survey map shows about ten houses or other buildings at Twilight; there were about sixteen in 1997.

References

Unincorporated communities in Ohio County, West Virginia
Unincorporated communities in West Virginia